Urocarpidium is a genus of flowering plants in the mallow family Malvaceae, native to the Andes mountains of South America. Many species originally placed in this genus were moved to Fuertesimalva in 1996.

Species
Species currently accepted by The Plant List are as follows: 
Urocarpidium albiflorum Ulbr.
Urocarpidium jacens (S. Watson) Krapov.
Urocarpidium mathewsii (Turcz.) Krapov.
Urocarpidium pentacoccum Krapov.
Urocarpidium pentandrum (K. Schum.) Krapov.
Urocarpidium sanambrosianum D.M. Bates

References

Malvaceae genera